Gangxia North station  is an interchange station for Line 2, Line 10, Line 11 and Line 14 of the Shenzhen Metro. Line 2 platforms opened on 28 June 2011, Line 10, Line 11 and Line 14 platforms opened on 28 October 2022. Measuring 220,000 meters square, it is 1.6 times as large as the nearby intermodal Futian station. It is the second four-line interchange hub in Shenzhen after Chegongmiao station.

Station layout

Exits
Note: Exit 2 - Exit 6, Exit 8 - Exit 11, Exit 13 - Exit 15 are not open.

Gallery

References

Shenzhen Metro stations
Railway stations in Guangdong
Futian District
Railway stations in China opened in 2011
Railway stations opened in 2011